Joyce Yang (Korean name 양희원, born 11 April 1986 in Seoul, Korea) is a classical pianist. Yang was awarded the silver medal at the 2005 Van Cliburn International Piano Competition at the age of 19. During the same competition, Joyce was also awarded both the Steven De Groote Memorial Award for Best Performance of Chamber Music, as well as the Beverley Taylor Smith Award for the Best Performance of a New Work.

Joyce Yang performed as soloist with the Kansas City Symphony for the world premiere of Jonathan Leshnoff's Piano Concerto in 2019.

Yang began playing piano at age four as her aunt's first piano student. At age nine, Yang went to New York with her mother and aunt to play for Yoheved Kaplinsky.  At age ten she entered the Korean National Conservatory studying under Choong Mo Kang. In 1997 Joyce moved to New York and began studying in Juilliard's pre-college division with Kaplinsky. While in New York, she attended Ward Melville High School.

Yang graduated from Juilliard with special honor, as the recipient of the 2010 Arthur Rubinstein Prize.

2017 Grammy Award nomination

On November 28, 2017 Yang and Italian violinist Augustin Hadelich's 2016 album Works for Violin and Piano by Franck, Kurtág, Previn, Schumann was nominated for the 60th Annual Grammy Award for Best Chamber Music/Small Ensemble Performance in the Classical Music category. It was Yang's first Grammy Award nomination.

Debuts

Discography

References

External links
 Joyce Yang official website

South Korean classical pianists
South Korean women pianists
Living people
1986 births
Prize-winners of the Van Cliburn International Piano Competition
21st-century pianists
Women classical pianists
Juilliard School alumni
21st-century women pianists